Milan Revický (born 20 May 1965) is a Slovak wrestler. He competed in the men's freestyle 74 kg at the 1992 Summer Olympics.

References

1965 births
Living people
Slovak male sport wrestlers
Olympic wrestlers of Czechoslovakia
Wrestlers at the 1992 Summer Olympics
Sportspeople from Bojnice